Jon Raven (1940–2015) was an English author and musician.

Early life
Jon Raven was the brother of author and musician Michael Raven, father of the late Ministry and Killing Joke bassist Paul Raven, and Gundogs bassist Daniel Raven. Raven was born in Wales and educated at Wolverhampton Municipal Grammar School. His wife was Kate, of Tettenhall, Wolverhampton. Alongside brother, Michael, Jon formed a Wolverhampton folk music group before producing records and books and making television and radio appearances. He was diagnosed with Parkinson's disease in 1996 and died in August 2015 at Compton Hospice in Wolverhampton.

Writing 
Raven is the author of non-fiction books, the majority related to Black Country history, customs, folklore and music and on industry typical of the Black Country area such as coal mining and nail making.

His books include The Folklore and Songs of the Black Country Colliers, Customs of the Black Country, and Aynuk's First Black Country Waerd Book.

Bibliography 
 Folk Songs of the Black Country – Wolverhampton Folk Song Club, 1964
 Folklore and Songs of the Black Country and West Midlands Volume I – Wolverhampton Folk Song Club, 1965
 Folklore and Songs of the Black Country and West Midlands Volume II – Wolverhampton Folk Song Club, 1966
 Folklore and Songs of the Black Country and West Midlands Volume III – Wolverhampton Folk Song Club, 1967
 Kate of Coalbrookdale – 1971
 Songs of a Changing World – Ginn & Co., 1972
 Canal Songs – 1974
 Turpin Hero – 1974
 The Nailmakers – The Black Country Society, 1975
 The Rigs of the Fair: Popular Sports and Pastimes in the Nineteenth Century through Songs, Ballads and Contemporary Accounts (Resources of Music) – Cambridge University Press, 1976
 The Urban and Industrial Songs of the Black Country and Birmingham – Broadside Books, 1977
 The Folklore of Staffordshire (The folklore of the British Isles) – Batsford, 1978
 Victoria's Inferno: Songs of the Old Mills, Mines, Manufactories, Canals and Railways – Broadside Books, 1978
 Tales from Aynuk's Black Country – Broadside Books, 1978
 Aynuk's First Black Country Waerd Book – Broadside Books, 1978
 Aynuk's Second Black Country Waerd Book – Broadside Books, 1979
 Black Country Songs and Rhymes: v. 1 – Broadside Books, 1979
 Theodore – 1984
 Black Country and Staffordshire: Stories, Customs, Superstitions, Tales and Folklore – Broadside Books, 1986
 Customs of the Black Country – Broadside Books, 1987
 The Book of the Black Country – Broadside Books, 1988
 Tettenhall – Broadside Books, 1989
 The Folklore and Songs of the Black Country Colliers – Broadside Books, 1990

Music 
Raven was a member of folk trio The Black Country Three along with brother Michael Raven and Derek Craft. They recorded their self-titled debut album in 1966 for Transatlantic. Following this, Raven produced several solo and group CDs.

He performed on the following albums:
 The Black Country Three by The Black Country Three (1966)
 Songs Of The Black Country And West Midlands by Jon Raven, Michael Raven & Jean Ward (1968)
 Jon Raven & The Halliard by Jon Raven & The Halliard (Nic Jones, Dave Moran & Nigel Paterson) (1968) (Later reissued on CD with "The Jolly Machine")
 Kate of Coalbrookdale by Jon Raven, Michael Raven and Jean Ward (1971)
 Ballad of the Black Country by Jon Raven, John Kirkpatrick, David Oxley and Mike Billington (1975)
 The Bold Navigators by Jon Raven, John Kirkpatrick, Sue Harris, Gary & Vera Aspey 1975)
 Harvest by Jon Raven, supported by Dave Oxley and Nigel M Jones (1976)
 Steam Ballads by Jon Raven, Harry Boardman, Kempion, and Tony Rose (1977)
 Fragile Life by Jon Raven, supported by Daniel Raven and Gavin Monaghan (1995)

References

1940 births
Date of birth missing
2015 deaths
English folk musicians
English non-fiction writers
People from the Black Country
English male non-fiction writers
People educated at Wolverhampton Grammar School
Neurological disease deaths in England
Deaths from Parkinson's disease